Kordkuy (also Romanized as Kord Kūy, Kord Kū, and Kurd Kūi) is a city and capital of Kordkuy County, in Golestan Province, Iran. At the 2006 census, its population was 28,991, in 7,611 families.

Kordkuy (means The neighborhood of Kurds)(former Tamiše ) is located on the west part of the Golestân province. It is connected to Bandar from the north and the west to Bandare Gaz the east to Gorgân and from the south to Dâmâqân of Semnân province. Its south parts are closed with the heights of Alborz (Elbruz) mountains. Kordkuy was a part  of Gorgân until 1979 when it gained town status. The former name of Kordkuy was "Tamiše" which was also attributed to the western part of Gorgân. Kordkuy's most harvests are husked rice, wheat, cotton and soya.
The people of Kordkoy speak the language of Mazanderani.
The word Kerd in Mazanderani language means shepherd.
The natives of Kordkoy city call their city Kard Male (kard mahalleh).

References

External links

Populated places in Kordkuy County
Cities in Golestan Province